Sans attendre (meaning Without Waiting) is the fourteenth French-language and twenty-fourth studio album by Canadian singer Celine Dion, released by Columbia Records on 2 November 2012. It is her first new French studio album since 2007's D'elles. Sans attendre features sixteen songs produced mainly by Jacques Veneruso, David Gategno and Scott Price. It contains three duets with Johnny Hallyday, Jean-Pierre Ferland and the late Henri Salvador. The first single from the album, "Parler à mon père" was released on 2 July 2012 and "Le miracle" was selected as the second track to promote Sans attendre. Both songs reached number one in Quebec and "Parler à mon père" also peaked inside the top ten in France. Third single, "Qui peut vivre sans amour?" was sent to radio stations in March 2013.

Sans attendre received mixed-to-positive reviews from music critics, some of whom noticed that it is a tastefully restrained, personal album. The various themes in the songs include longing for a departed father, the cruelty of love, the healing power of tears, the waning days of an ageing mother or the misery of a baby's death. On the commercial level, the album became a smash success in all French-speaking territories. It debuted at number one in Canada and France with an impressive first week sales of almost 100,000 units in each country. Sans attendre also topped the chart in the French-speaking part of Switzerland (Romandy), Belgium Wallonia and reached number two in Switzerland (including non-French-speaking areas) and number eight in Poland and South Korea. It was certified Diamond in France, three-times Platinum in Canada, Platinum in Belgium, and Gold in Switzerland and Poland. Sans attendre has sold over 1.5 million copies worldwide.

Background
On 7 June 2012, Dion's official website announced that during April and May, the singer began recording songs for her next French and English albums. The French album would feature all new material and the English one would include studio versions of previously unreleased songs from Dion's Las Vegas show, Celine, as well as several brand new tracks. When asked about the difference between singing in French and in English, Dion answered: "It's like wearing a pair of jeans or an evening gown. You cannot change what's in your blood. French is my home, my roots. It's where I live first. French is a more interior energy, more poetic. But, when I sing in English, there are different emotions. As a singer I cannot choose, I need both". On 29 June 2012, celinedion.com previewed a thirty-second fragment of the first single written and co-produced by Jacques Veneruso, "Parler à mon père" from the French-language album which was scheduled for release on 5 November 2012. However, in selected European countries, it was released on 2 November 2012. The cover art for the single was revealed at the same time. The full version of "Parler à mon père" premiered on 1 July 2012 and the single was released to digital outlets in selected countries on the next day.

During the interview with Le Parisien, Dion announced the title of upcoming French album, Sans attendre which means "without waiting". Later she revealed that for her the title means "don't leave until tomorrow what you can do today" and that "today" is the most important day. She also talked about "Parler à mon père", which is about her father who died in 2003. He was her biggest fan and she thinks of him every day and knows that he is always with her, watching over her children. On 19 August 2012, Dion's official website posted information that the album will include "Une chance qu'on s'a", a duet with Canadian artist Jean-Pierre Ferland, who also wrote the song's lyrics. Dion and Ferland had previously joined their voices during the Céline sur les Plaines concert that celebrated Quebec City's 400th anniversary in 2008. Another duet with French singer Johnny Hallyday was also announced. A sneak preview of the music video for "Parler à mon père" was posted on celinedion.com on 5 September 2012 and the full video premiered the next day. It was filmed in Las Vegas on 16 July 2012 and in the Death Valley, and directed by Thierry Vargnes who previously worked with Dion on the music videos for "Et s'il n'en restait qu'une (je serais celle-là)" and "Immensité". Dion finished recording her French-language album in September 2012.

Content
On 1 October 2012, Dion's official website presented the album's cover art and announced in a press release that Sans attendre will be released in two versions: standard edition with fourteen tracks and twenty-four-page booklet in jewel case and deluxe edition with sixteen songs, twenty-four-page booklet and a twelve-page desk calendar in a special digipak. The cover for the album was created by the illustrator Aurore Hutton, niece of former French President Valéry Giscard d'Estaing. Jean-Pierre Ferland, a Canadian singer and songwriter appears twice on the album. He recorded his own song, "Une chance qu'on s'a" in duet with Dion and wrote the lyrics for "Je n'ai pas besoin d'amour". Ferland already performed two songs with Dion during the Céline sur les Plaines concert which was released on DVD in 2008. Luc Plamondon, a Canadian lyricist offered her "Que toi au monde". Both artists worked together on Dion chante Plamondon in 1991. Several other artists also joined Dion for duets: a French singer and actor, Johnny Hallyday on "L'amour peut prendre froid" (a French-language adaptation of "Love Me Anyway" performed by Mary Ann Redmond) and the late French-Caribbean singer, Henri Salvador in a virtual duet titled "Tant de temps". Dion performed two duets with Hallyday in the past, both during the French television specials: "L'envie" in 2005 and "Blueberry Hill" in 2007. Also during the French television special in 2003, she performed a duet with Salvador on "Le loup, la biche et le chevalier (une chanson douce)". The studio solo version of this song was later included on Miracle.

Newcomers to Dion's list of collaborators include Grand Corps Malade, who penned the lyrics for "La mer et l'enfant" and Stanislas with Maxime Le Forestier who wrote "Moi quand je pleure" (in 2000, Le Forestier co-wrote "Tomber" which was later recorded by Dion in English as "Ten Days" and included on A New Day Has Come). Jacques Veneruso, a longtime collaborator wrote "Parler à mon père", the first single. He also co-produced the album and composed the arrangements for most songs. Veneruso worked with Dion on her previous number-one albums: 1 fille & 4 types (2003), On ne change pas (2005) and D'elles (2007). He is the author of many of her French-language hits, including "Sous le vent", "Tout l'or des hommes" and "Je ne vous oublie pas". Another member of the team was David Gategno who produced and wrote the music for four songs. He worked with Dion previously on D'elles and was responsible for her French number-one single, "Et s'il n'en restait qu'une (je serais celle-là)". Sans attendre also includes a studio version of "Ne me quitte pas", which Dion performed during her Las Vegas residency show, Celine. The song was written and originally recorded by the Belgian singer-songwriter Jacques Brel in 1959. The lyrics and thirty-second previews of all songs were posted on celinedion.com on 18 October 2012. According to Dion, "this album is about feelings and being close to the people who have known me a long time. I can speak to them freely without having to convince them of what I'm capable of. It's like a VIP invitation: I invite you into my home". In May 2013, the deluxe edition of Sans attendre was re-released in France, Belgium and Switzerland including a fifty-six-page notebook with drawings by Aurore Hutton, replacing the desk calendar.

Promotion
For the release of her new French-language album, Dion taped a television special, Céline Dion… Sans attendre in Montreal on 15 October 2012 which was broadcast on 4 November 2012 on TVA. She performed selected songs from Sans attendre, including: "Parler à mon père", "Je n'ai pas besoin d'amour", "Une chance qu'on s'a" with Jean-Pierre Ferland, "Celle qui m'a tout appris", "Que toi au monde", "La mer et l'enfant" and "Le miracle". In other parts of the television special, the recording of "Les petits pieds de Léa" in the studio was shown, Dion performed "Mille après mille" with Fred Pellerin and a medley of her hits with Star Académie contestants. Véronic DiCaire, a Canadian imitator also performed on the show. The television special became the most watched show of the fall on Quebec television with 2,386,000 viewers and 57,9% market share. Also for the promotion in Quebec, Dion performed "Je n'ai pas besoin d'amour" on Tout le monde en parle which aired on 11 November 2012. On 22 November 2012, she received a Bambi Award in Germany and performed "River Deep, Mountain High" and "Ne me quitte pas" during the ceremony.

The second television special, this time for France was titled Céline Dion, Le grand show and broadcast on 24 November 2012 on France 2. Dion performed four songs from Sans attendre: "Parler à mon père", "L'amour peut prendre froid" with Johnny Hallyday, "Le miracle" and "Qui peut vivre sans amour?". The show included performances by many various artists who sang their own songs or Dion's tributes. She also performed duets with Patrick Bruel on "Qui a le droit...", Florent Pagny on "J'irai où tu iras" and Michel Sardou on "Voler", and sang few of her hits. The television special became the second most-watched show that night, drawing an audience of 4,874,000 viewers and losing only slightly to Danse avec les stars with 5,040,000 million followers. On 28 November 2012, during C à vous on France 5 Dion performed "La mer et l'enfant". On 2 December 2012, she appeared in Chabada on France 3 and sang three songs from Sans attendre: "Le miracle", "Ne me quitte pas" with Florent Pagny, and "Parler à mon père". She also performed some duets with artists invited to the show. The episode dedicated to Dion became a great success with 1.5 million viewers, setting a record for Chabada. Also on 2 December 2012, Dion sang "Parler à mon père" on Vivement Dimanche on France 2. On 17 December 2012, she appeared on France 3 on a show called Céline en toute intimité. Dion was interviewed by the host and performed selected songs from Sans attendre, including "Si je n'ai rien de toi", "Le miracle", "Attendre" and "L'amour peut prendre froid" with Johnny Hallyday. The show also included fragments form the Canadian television special. On 20 December 2012, Dion was the guest of honour in another television special titled We Love Céline on NRJ 12. She sang "Parler à mon père", "Qui peut vivre sans amour?" and "Le miracle". Dion also performed a duet with Maurane on "Quand on n'a que l'amour" and sang "Pour que tu m'aimes encore" a cappella with Chimène Badi. Many other artists paid her tributes singing her songs, including Stanislas who performed "Moi quand je pleure". During Dion's promotional visit in France in November 2012, she has also recorded a performance of "Ne me quitte pas" for Simplement pour un soir which was broadcast on 12 January 2013 on France 2. The promotion for Sans attendre ended on 20 January 2013, when a performance of "Le miracle" filmed in November 2012, was shown on Vivement Dimanche.

Six months later on 27 July 2013, Dion performed six songs from Sans attendre during her one night only concert in Quebec, called Céline... une seule fois. Because of the success of Sans attendre, she also embarked on the Sans attendre Tour in November 2013 and performed sold-out concerts in Belgium and France. During her visit in France in November and December 2013, Dion performed "Parler à mon père" and "Qui peut vivre sans amour?" on C'est votre vie and "Parler à mon père" on Les chansons d'abord. Additionally, her concert Céline... une seule fois was broadcast in late December 2013 in Switzerland, France and Belgium. She also performed "Parler à mon père" as a duet with Tal on Ce soir on chante, which was broadcast on 3 January 2014. The Céline... une seule fois concert with bonus tracks recorded in Paris during Sans attendre Tour, titled Céline une seule fois / Live 2013 was released on 16 May 2014.

Singles
The first single, "Parler à mon père" was released to digital stores on 2 July 2012 and reached number one for ten weeks in Quebec, number seven in the French-speaking part of Switzerland (Romandy), number eight in France, number eleven in Belgium Wallonia and number twenty-five in Switzerland (including the non-French-speaking areas). The music video for the song premiered on 6 September 2012. The second single, "Le miracle" was announced on 28 October 2012 and the music video premiered on 20 November 2012. The song peaked at number one in Quebec and reached number twenty-seven in Belgium Wallonia and number seventy-seven in France. Although not released as a single, "Les petits pieds de Léa" reached number eighty on the Canadian Hot 100 thanks to digital sales after the album's release. Third single, "Qui peut vivre sans amour?" was announced by Dion's official website on 10 February 2013 and it was sent to radio stations in Francophone countries in March 2013. The music video premiered on 19 April 2013. On 8 April 2014, "Celle qui m'a tout appris" was announced as a single supporting Dion's new live release, Céline une seule fois / Live 2013.

Critical reception

Sans attendre received mixed-to-positive reviews from music critics. According to Bernard Perusse from The Gazette, the album is full of big dramatic emotion with various themes in the songs: longing for a departed father, the cruelty of love, the healing power of tears, the waning days of an aging mother, the emotional consolation sought by a single parent, the loss of a lover to war, the realization that a long-standing relationship is dead, the misery of a baby's death and the romantic upheaval of a serious fight. Perusse praised the "lightly-orchestrated" "Moi quand je pleure" with unusual chord structure, the "refreshingly subdued" "Parler à mon père" and "Le miracle", a "forceful attack" on Jacques Brel's classic "Ne me quitte pas" and the "serviceable pop" of "Les jours comme ça". However, he called "Qui peut vivre sans amour?" a "quasi-arena-rock showcase" and "Les petits pieds de Léa" an "unfortunate" composition which came out of the grief. In the latter track, a mother sings to her dead baby and ruminates on all the moments they will not share. The inspiration is from lyricist Marianne L'Heureux's real-life tragedy. According to Alain de Repentigny from La Presse, authors and composers on Sans attendre are not equally talented and often the singer looks better. He suggested that finding someone like Jean-Jacques Goldman and making the whole album with him would be a better choice. Repentigny praised "Celle qui m'a tout appris" with lyrics by Nina Bouraoui, calling it one of the best songs on the album. Another song that stands out is "Que toi au monde", written by Luc Plamondon about the soldier who goes to war. Repentigny also mentioned "Tant de temps" as a "beautiful" track and a "great vintage", quite different from the version published on Henri Salvador's bossa nova album of the same name, released earlier in 2012. According to Kieron Tyler from The Arts Desk, the album "isn't going to stop the world turning" but "it is good. In general, Sans attendre embraces a glossy, modern "chanson Française" with songs that have "yearning, rolling" melodies. The "mid-pace is never breached", and any chance to "dive into a soaring chorus" is taken. What's most striking about Sans attendre is its restraint. The "swirling" "Celle qui m'a tout appris" could have transformed itself into a power ballad, but instead it's about the melody and mood. Even the "massed kiddie chorus" on "Le miracle" is "kept in check" and doesn't "stray into the glutinous". "Je n'ai pas besoin d'amour" is an "intimate, aural swoon". Although Tyler criticized the album's "slightly cheesy chick lit-style graphics", he wrote that Sans attendre contains stylish modern pop of a type that "begs to be heard beyond the world it's addressing". Among the songs worth downloading, Darryl Sterdan from Ottawa Sun mentioned "Qui peut vivre sans amour?" and "Attendre". Paula Haddad from Music Story praised the playful melody of "Moi quand je pleure" and wrote that the accordion-driven "La mer et l'enfant" is the most beautiful song dedicated to motherhood.

Lea Hermann from Focus praised Dion's vocal talent but called the album trivial. She noticed that especially two songs stand out: a rock-inspired, dramatic "Qui peut vivre sans amour" and the '90s-sounding duet with Johnny Hallyday, "L'amour peut prendre froid". Among good tracks she also mentioned "Le miracle" with "fresh spring-like" background vocals, the brisk opener "Parler à mon père",  "Une chance qu'on s'a" which she compared to "Beauty and the Beast", quiet and melancholic "Que toi au monde", and  "Les petits pieds de Léa" with the intro which sounds like the melody of a music box. Hermann praised the playful and girlish look of the album cover and booklet, "lovingly" illustrated with hearts, children's toys and clef that alludes to Dion's double life as a singer and mother. She stated that most of the songs on Sans attendre are equally playful and girlish. According to Łukasz Mantiuk from All About Music, the album is good. Sans attendre is definitely a lot quieter and milder than D'elles but it has its charm. Among the best tracks he mentioned "Qui peut vivre sans amour?", "Si je n'ai rien de toi", "Le miracle", "Parler à mon père" and "Ne me quitte pas". However, he criticized the duets, calling them similar to each other. According to Jonathan Hamard from Pure Charts, "Si je n'ai rien de toi" is one of the most enjoyable songs on the album. On the other hand, themes of life and dead are mixed on tracks like "Les petits pieds de Léa" and "Parler à mon père". Generally, the melodies on the album are very successful but several new titles lack of character. The single, "Le miracle" which is "one big ray of sunshine" in this melancholy album, is not very original, the same as "Celle qui m'a tout appris", "Que toi au monde" and "Une chance qu'on s'a". Hamard also stated that the duets left him "hungry for more". According to him, the album is uneven and inconsistent, maybe because of many writers and producers participating in the project. Marty Tobin from Quai Baco also wrote that the album is unequal with good songs and some which are superfluous. He praised "Parler à mon père" for its composition and production by Jacques Veneruso and "Le miracle" which works because of the choir and "Céline's touch", but the best song on the album is "Moi quand je pleure", written by Maxime Le Forestier and Stanislas. Among the weakest songs, Tobin mentioned "Attendre" which according to him does not leave a lasting impression. Stephen Thomas Erlewine of AllMusic gave the album three and a half out of five stars calling it a moody collection. According to him, the production is relatively restrained and, in turn, it gives plenty of space for Dion to "grandstand on these tales of heartbreak, aging, and death". Erlewine noted that "these aren't songs of love; they're songs of loss, and that there's a genuine pathos in them". He called Sans attendre one of Dion's best albums in recent years.

Commercial reception
In Canada, Sans attendre entered atop the albums chart with sales of 92,135 copies, including 88,206 units sold in Quebec alone. Sans attendre achieved the second biggest one week sales total in 2012, trailing Taylor Swift's Red by less than 450 copies. It was also the best debut week for Dion since One Heart sold 97,000 units in 2003 and the best first week total for a Canadian artist since 2006, when Gregory Charles sold 93,000 copies of I Think of You. Sans Attendre also achieved the second best one week sales for a Francophone album in the
SoundScan era, trailing the first Star Académie release, which sold 174,000 units in its debut week in
2003. In the second week, the album fell to number two selling 28,000 copies. The next week, it fell to number three and on 26 November 2012, Sans attendre was certified three-times Platinum in Canada for shipping 240,000 units. In the fourth week, it jumped to number two and the next week the album fell to number four. After only five weeks, Sans attendre was placed at number seventeen on the Billboard'''s Canadian Albums Year-End Chart of 2012. In the sixth week, it fell to number seven, and the next week it climbed to number six. In the eighth week, which was the last week of 2012, the album fell to number ten. On the SoundScan's Canadian Albums Year-End Chart of 2012, which included only eight weeks of sales of Sans attendre, the album reached number five selling 209,000 copies, including 198,500 units sold in Quebec alone. Sans attendre also spent nine weeks at number one on the Quebec Albums Chart. As of July 2013, the album has shipped over 300,000 copies in Canada.

In France, the album debuted at number one selling 95,569 copies. It became the second-biggest debut of 2012, only behind Le bal des Enfoirés by Les Enfoirés. In the second week, Sans attendre fell to number two selling 48,109 units. It was dethroned by Johnny Hallyday's album, L'attente which also includes "L'amour peut prendre froid", a duet with Dion. On 24 November 2012, during the French television special, Dion received three-times Platinum award for shipping 300,000 copies of Sans attendre in France. In the third week, the album has sold 35,910 units and fell to number four. The next week, after the television special, Sans attendre jumped to number three with sales of 57,643 copies. In the fifth week, it stayed at number three selling 65,220 units. The next week, the album jumped to number two with another sales increase, selling 77,835 copies. In the seventh week, just before Christmas, Sans attendre returned to the number one position with its biggest weekly sales of 140,718 units (up 81%) and the second-best weekly score of 2012. In the last week of 2012, it fell to number two selling 47,605 copies. After just eight weeks, Sans attendre became the best selling physical album of 2012 in France and second best selling album overall, with total sales of 568,609 units. On 31 December 2012, it was certified Diamond for selling over 500,000 copies. In the first four weeks of 2013, Sans attendre stayed at number two selling 20,397, 13,929, 10,323 and 9,854 copies, respectively. The next week, the album fell to number four selling 7,905 units. In the fourteenth week, Sans attendre fell to number five with sales of 7,068 copies. The next week, the album fell to number eight selling 7,200 units and bringing the total sales to 645,285 copies. As of November 2013, Sans attendre has shipped over 800,000 copies in France, making it one of the best selling albums in recent years.

It also peaked at number one in Belgium Wallonia (for five non-consecutive weeks) and the French-speaking part of Switzerland (Romandy), number two in Switzerland (including non-French-speaking areas) and Taiwan, and number eight in Poland and South Korea, and was certified Platinum in Belgium, and Gold in Switzerland and Poland. After only six weeks, the album was placed on the year-end charts of 2012 in Belgium Wallonia (number four) and Switzerland (number thirty-nine). As of November 2013, Sans attendre has sold over 1.5 million copies around the world.

Accolades

In January 2013, Dion was nominated as Female Artist of the Year at the Victoires de la Musique but lost to Lou Doillon. In February 2013, she was nominated in three categories at the Juno Awards of 2013, including Album of the Year (Sans attendre), Adult Contemporary Album of the Year (Sans attendre) and Fan Choice Award. In March 2013, Dion was also nominated in four categories at the World Music Awards: World's Best Female Artist, World's Best Live Act, World's Best Entertainer of the Year and her album Sans attendre was nominated for World's Best Album.
In September 2013, she was nominated for six Félix Awards in the categories: Female Artist of the Year, Most Successful Quebecois Artist Outside Quebec, Most Popular Song of the Year ("Parler à mon père"), Adult Contemporary Album of the Year (Sans attendre), Best-Selling Album of the Year (Sans attendre), and Music Television Show of the Year (for the television special Céline Dion… Sans attendre). Sans attendre'' won two Félix Awards in October 2013, including Adult Contemporary Album of the Year and Best-Selling Album of the Year.

Track listing

Personnel
Adapted from AllMusic.

 Celine Dion – lead vocals
 John C. Arnold – violin
 Stephane Aubin – piano, keyboards, programming
 Michel Aymé – guitars
 Svetlin Belneev – violin
 Denis Benarrosh – percussion
 Thierry Blanchard – producer, arranger, piano, keyboards, programming, engineer
 Marc Berthoumieux – accordion
 Audrey Bocahut – harp
 Jean-Sébastien Carré – violin
 Yvan Cassar – producer, piano
 Raphaël Chassin – drums, percussion
 Eric Chevalier – programming
 Choeurs du Studio Meyes de La Ciotat – background vocals
 Bob Clearmountain – engineer
 Laurent Coppola – drums
 Irena Z. Chirkova – cello
 Lisa D. Donlinger – violin
 Mathieu Dulong – engineer's assistant
 Jean-François Durez – percussion
 Philippe Dunnigan – violin solo
 Jenny K. Elfving – violin
 Delphine Elbé – background vocals
 David Diffon – engineer's assistant
 Ensamble Philippe Dunnigan – strings and horns
 Ryan Freeland – engineer
 François Gauthier – engineer
 David Gategno – producer, piano, keyboards, guitars, percussion, programming, engineer
 Jerome G. Gordon – violin
 Emmanuel Guerrero – piano
 Lenka Hajkova – violin
 André Hampartzoumian – electric guitars
 Patrick Hampartzoumian – producer, arranger, percussion, background vocals, programming, engineer
 Jean-Marc Haroutiounian – bass
 Raymond Holzknecht – engineer's assistant
 Pierre Jaconelli – guitars
 Laraine Renee Kaiser – violin
 Freddy Koella – guitars
 Dimitri Kourka – violin
 François Lalonde – engineer
 Marc Langis – bass
 Claude Lemay – producer, arranger, piano, orchestrator, conductor
 Deann Letourneau – violin
 Stéphane Levy – engineer
 Christian Loigerot – engineer
 Sean O'Dyer – engineer's assistant
 Paul Picard – percussion
 Paris Pop Orchestra – orchestra
 Kalia A. Potts – violin
 Scott Price – producer, arranger, piano, keyboards
 Agnès Puget – background vocals
 Rebecca Ramsey - violin
 Stanislas – producer, conductor, orchestrator
 Stéphane Rullière – violin solo
 Zizou Sadki – bass
 Denis Savage – engineer
 Julien Schultheis – producer, arranger, piano, keyboards, drums, programming
 Raymond Bill Sicam – cello
 Jeff Smallwood – guitars
 Emilie Smill – background vocals
 Dominique Spagnolo – piano
 Lindsey Springer – cello
 Cyril Tarquiny – guitars
 Jean Michel Tavernier – horn
 Eric Tewalt – flute
 Laurent Vernerey – bass
 Jacques Veneruso – producer, arranger, guitars, ukulele, background vocals

Charts

Weekly charts

Year-end charts

All-time charts

Certifications and sales

Release history

See also

 Félix Award
 List of best-selling albums in France
 List of number-one albums of 2012 (Canada)
 List of number-one singles of 2012 (France)

References

External links
 

2012 albums
Celine Dion albums
French-language albums